Roos-Anne (Sanne) Hans (born 22 September 1984 in Dedemsvaart), is a Dutch singer-songwriter and guitar player. She was part of Ysis until 2008 and later formed the band Miss Montreal.

Ysis
Sanne Hans first was part of the formation Ysis made up of her on vocals and guitar, Inge van Calkar also on guitar and vocals and Ilse Gerritsen on the cello. They all stutter, which didn't impact on their singing.

Miss Montreal
October 2008 she started as the lead singer of a new band Miss Montreal, together with Kobus Groen (bass, backing vocals), Michi Schwiemann (guitar), Thijs Rensink (drums) and Peter Hendriks (keyboards). Their first single was "Just a Flirt" followed by a debut album the self-titled Miss Montreal in May 2009 releasing "This is my life" as a second single. She appeared in a number of festivals including in Lowlands, Parkpop, Beatstad and Zwarte Cross and opened for Coldplay at the Goffertpark in front of 70,000 spectators. She sang "Won't You Let Me Have My Way with You" featuring Bertolf Lentink in a joint EP released in 2009 by the two artists.

The second Miss Montreal album So... Anything Else came in July 2010 with a grand tour of 20 Dutch cities to promote the album. The tour continued until April 2011.  Her third album I Am a Hunter was released on 13 April 2012, engaging on another long tour called "S-SS-SSS-Sanne" stretching until March 2013.

Solo career
In addition to her work in Ysis and Miss Montreal, she has also pursued a solo career. After Ysis disbanded in 2008, she did advertising features and appeared on various radio and television shows. She also sang "Dansen aan zee" with Dutch band BLØF and "I Am Sorry" with Dutch band Only Seven Left.

She became famous by singing the intro to the children TV program Huisje, Boompje, Beestje in 2009. and in 2012, she appeared as a member of the jury of the television series De beste singer-songwriter van Nederland, and she was a coach on the sixth, seventh and eighth seasons of The Voice of Holland. It was announced on 24 June 2019 by the broadcaster's Facebook, that Sanne would be replacing Ilse Delange as coach in the ninth season of The Voice Kids.

Discography: Sanne Hans

Singles

Discography: Miss Montreal

Albums

Demo albums

Compilation albums

EPs
2009: Miss Montreal / Bertolf (joint EP) [8ball Music]

Singles

Tip means the release did not chart on the Dutch Top 40, but appeared on the Tipparade for "bubbling under" hits
*Did not appear in the official Belgian Ultratop 50 charts, but rather in the bubbling under Ultratip charts.

Other charting songs

References

External links

1984 births
Living people
People from Avereest
21st-century Dutch singers
21st-century Dutch women singers